This is a list of cathedrals in the state of Pennsylvania, United States:

See also
List of cathedrals in the United States

References

 Pennsylvania
Cathedrals in Pennsylvania
Pennsylvania
Cathedrals